Chansy Phosikham (born 13 March 1948) is a Laotian politician and member of the Lao People's Revolutionary Party (LPRP). He was born in 1948 in Luang Prabang Province, and served as a Deputy Governor and Governor of Luang Prabang Province. He was later appointed Governor of the National Bank in 2002, then appointed Minister of Finance in January 2003 and later serving As Governor Viang Chan Municipality.

He was elected to the LPRP Central Committee at the 5th National Congress and retained his seat until the 11th National Congress. At the 9th National Congress he was elected to the LPRP Politburo and the LPRP Secretariat, and he retained his seat in both organs until the 11th National Congress.

References

Specific

Bibliography
Books:
 

Living people
1948 births
Members of the 5th Central Committee of the Lao People's Revolutionary Party
Members of the 6th Central Committee of the Lao People's Revolutionary Party
Members of the 7th Central Committee of the Lao People's Revolutionary Party
Members of the 8th Central Committee of the Lao People's Revolutionary Party
Members of the 9th Central Committee of the Lao People's Revolutionary Party
Members of the 10th Central Committee of the Lao People's Revolutionary Party
Members of the 10th Politburo of the Lao People's Revolutionary Party
Members of the 9th Secretariat of the Lao People's Revolutionary Party
Members of the 10th Secretariat of the Lao People's Revolutionary Party
Governors of Luang Prabang
Deputy governors of Luang Prabang
Finance Ministers of Laos
Government ministers of Laos
Lao People's Revolutionary Party politicians
Place of birth missing (living people)
People from Luang Prabang province